Dual specificity phosphatase 8 is a protein that in humans is encoded by the DUSP8 gene.

Function
The protein encoded by this gene is a member of the dual specificity protein phosphatase subfamily. These phosphatases inactivate their target kinases by dephosphorylating both the phosphoserine/threonine and phosphotyrosine residues. They negatively regulate members of the mitogen-activated protein (MAP) kinase superfamily (MAPK/ERK, SAPK/JNK, p38), which is associated with cellular proliferation and differentiation. Different members of the family of dual specificity phosphatases show distinct substrate specificities for various MAP kinases, different tissue distribution and subcellular localization, and different modes of inducibility of their expression by extracellular stimuli. This gene product inactivates SAPK/JNK and p38, is expressed predominantly in the adult brain, heart, and skeletal muscle, is localized in the cytoplasm, and is induced by nerve growth factor and insulin. An intronless pseudogene for DUSP8 is present on chromosome 10q11.2.

References

Further reading